Margaret J. "Peggy" Hill ( Platter) (February 6, born 1954) is a fictional character in the Fox animated series King of the Hill, voiced by Kathy Najimy. She is the matriarch of the Hill family and the wife of series protagonist Hank Hill, mother to Robert Jeffrey "Bobby" Hill, and aunt to Luanne Platter.

Fictional character biography 
Peggy was born in Montana to cattle ranchers and moved to Texas as a young woman during high school where she met Hank Hill. She is 5'7". She wears glasses and is generally seen wearing sleeveless blouses and culottes. She wears a size 16½ shoe on her left foot, and a size 16 on her right. Her feet are the one trait she is deeply insecure about, despite the fact that it's been said that such feet give her exceptional confidence, perfect posture and incredible athletic ability. She is gifted at softball, among other sports. She is also skilled at playing the dice-based word game Boggle, and once won the Texas State Boggle Championship.

Within the household, Peggy provides a voice of reason to and a buffer between Hank and Bobby, who have difficulty relating to each other. Peggy has taken Hank to task about their relationship, or the lack thereof. Peggy's devotion to family extends to her niece Luanne, whom she thinks of as a daughter. Peggy freely encourages Bobby and Luanne; sometimes to Hank's distress. Peggy's high opinion of herself is often quite an annoyance to her family and friends. She usually considers herself smarter than everyone she meets and knows; more attractive than Luanne, Nancy and many other more conventionally attractive women; and constantly takes credit for things she has never done. She also assumes that everyone else thinks as highly of her as she herself does.

She believes that she can do anything if she commits herself. This often gets her into trouble, as she takes the philosophy too literally. Peggy often plunges into things, disregarding her own complete lack of skill; for example, during the episode "Phish and Wildlife," she walks onto a crime scene expecting to become part of the investigation just because she is "on a roll." Her inability to understand the potential consequences of her actions has led to the harm of those around her.

Peggy prides herself as a cook, although others consider her cooking to be average. Her family dinners are a regular rotation of a few menu items: Frito pie with Wolf Brand Chili on Mondays; fried pork chops on Tuesdays; and on Wednesdays "Spa-Peggy" and meatballs, the one dish which, according to Hank, "she's kind of made her own," though it is simply spaghetti with meatballs with "just the right amount of sugar and grated parmigiana cheese." She is also proud of her Apple Brown Betty to which she adds a spoonful of orange juice.

As the series progresses, it puts increasing emphasis on Peggy's superiority complex. As her egotism grows to extremes, other characters become more aware of it, but seem to tolerate Peggy's behavior. Hank truly loves Peggy and indeed tolerates her ego on numerous occasions, but at one point, he has enough of Peggy's ego and directly confronts Peggy after she attacks Randy Travis in public, claiming he stole a song she wrote. The irony in this is that Randy Travis did indeed steal the song, but not even Hank believed her due to her egotism.

Another defining trait is her need to feel important and be the best. This can lead her to be shallow and petty if she perceives her position being threatened. During "Goodbye Normal Jeans", she began feeling threatened by Bobby, when his new found talent for domestic skills outshined her own in Hank's eyes. She began trying and failing to out do him, all culminating in her stealing the Thanksgiving turkey he prepared.

Character flaws aside, Peggy is a kind person at heart who often works from the best motives. Peggy is completely devoted to her husband and family. She refers to Hank as the love of her life and has demonstrated her love for and protectiveness of him several times. However, Peggy makes no secret of her contempt for her father-in-law, Cotton Hill, particularly because of his neglectful, cruel behavior toward Hank. Cotton shows even more disrespect towards Peggy herself, including only referring to her as "Hank's wife" instead of her name. Her hatred of Cotton is such that she accepts his offer to literally dance on his grave. This hatred between the two even continues when Cotton is on his deathbed. While Hank is out of the room, Peggy tells Cotton exactly what she thinks of him just before he dies. When Hank returns, she lies and says Cotton said kind things about Hank before his passing.

Family 
Peggy has a strained relationship with her parents. Her mother is emotionally cold towards her and her father constantly speaks in riddles. These portrayals of her parents, from the episode "A Rover Runs Through It", are actually a retconned version noticeably different from the homemaker mother – and presumably equally suburban father – displayed in flashbacks in the earlier episodes "I Remember Mono" and "Transnational Amusements Presents: Peggy's Magic Sex Feet". Early on in the series, Mrs. Platter is seen visiting the Hills' home, implying that she lives in or near Arlen, Texas, and is on speaking terms with her daughter, although the episode "Happy Hank's Giving", in which Mrs. Platter appears in her original incarnation, implies that her mother either still lives in Montana or has moved back there. This persona is retconned by "A Rover Runs Through It". The suggestion in the later episode is that Peggy left her parents behind when she went to Texas, which is a significant alteration to the previously stated timeline. In both incarnations, Mrs. Platter tends to be critical, unappreciative, and dismissive of her daughter as a whole.

Peggy thinks of Luanne as a surrogate daughter and does her best to give her guidance and encourage her; always wanting the best for her. With this in mind, Peggy is openly critical of Luanne's choice to get involved with Lucky, who Peggy views as not being good enough for Luanne. At first, Peggy sabotages Lucky's efforts to better himself by getting a GED. But, in the end, Peggy accepted the relationship, realizing that Lucky made Luanne happy and that Lucky was a genuinely good man. Peggy is very protective of Luanne, and has defended her niece from Luanne's abusive and alcoholic mother, Leanne.

Peggy also has a brother named Hoyt who is Luanne's father. Peggy lied to Luanne by telling her that Hoyt was working on an oil rig when he was actually in prison. When Hoyt returned to Arlen, Peggy tried to help him out and gave him money, but eventually realized Hoyt was an incorrigible criminal and would destroy the entire family. Hank then tricked Hoyt into committing an obvious crime and convinced him to confess to it along with an earlier robbery. This would send him to prison for life, but maintain Luanne's false impression of her father as a good and hard-working man. Peggy and Hank then told Luanne that Hoyt had accepted "a lifetime contract" to work on an oil rig.

Jobs 
At the start of the series, Peggy works as a substitute teacher at Arlen High School and Tom Landry Middle School, typically teaching Spanish. A running gag in the show is her overconfidence in speaking the language, when she in fact speaks it poorly and doesn't understand it as well as she believes she does. For example, in "Lupe's Revenge" her poor understanding of the language caused her to mistakenly bring a young Mexican girl back to Texas after a school field trip across the Mexican border, confusing the child saying "Yo vivo en México", which means "I live in Mexico" in Spanish, with "Viva México", which means "Long live Mexico". Her own egotism makes her believe she is better at speaking it than native Mexicans. Peggy often remarks she won the "Substitute Teacher Of The Year" three years in a row. For the third year, she claimed an award for the school itself that was really for Hank.

In the third season, she begins writing a column for a local newspaper, the Arlen Bystander, and is still seen sub-editing from time to time. In season 11, after writing a negative article about a local real-estate agent, she is fired from the newspaper but then hired by the real-estate agent where she then works for the remainder of the series. In her job as a real estate agent, she is moderately successful at selling real estate and is willing to go to outrageous lengths to make a sale, including over-zealous self-promotion on her part.

Character analysis 
Although Peggy is often cited as "the hated wife and mother of adult animated TV" due to her arrogance and character flaws, Austin Jones argues that she is one of the shows most complex characters, and a "keen satire on the way Southern suburbia mollifies women with talent into embittered sidekick roles to mediocre men".

According to Jo Johnson, Peggy differs from the usual depiction of women in adult animated sitcoms due to the fact that she is both a mother and homemaker while also being employed. In most other animated sitcoms, such as The Simpsons, regular employment is "bestowed upon male breadwinners or single unattractive females". Johnson argues that Peggy's ability to comfortably juggle her role at home with a career "sets her apart from other animated mothers".

Lara Karaian states that the characters of King of the Hill represent stereotypes of working class southern communities. They describe Peggy as the "liberal feminist of her southern town", and is "someone who stands by her man while still remaining a strong and independent Texas woman", comparing her to Hillary Clinton.

See also 
Hank Hill
Bobby Hill
List of King of the Hill characters

Notes

References

External links 

Television characters introduced in 1997
Animated characters introduced in 1997
Fictional characters from Montana
Fictional characters from Texas
Fictional cheerleaders
Fictional real estate brokers
Fictional schoolteachers
Fictional writers
King of the Hill characters
Female characters in animated series
Narcissism in television